Anna Ciddor (born January 1957) is an Australian author and illustrator.

Ciddor is a patron of Oz Kids, an organisation to promote and support children's literary and artistic talents and a 2021 ambassador for Australia Reads. In 2021 she won the Nance Donkin Award for Children's Literature.

Biography 
Ciddor was born in January 1957 in Melbourne. She was brought up in a house without television, and had an inventive and creative childhood. She also had a strong interest in mathematics, and after finishing school, she obtained a Bachelor of Arts degree with a major in mathematics from the University of Melbourne and a Diploma of Education from Melbourne State College. Her first career was as a senior school mathematics teacher, and it was only after marrying and having children that she began writing and illustrating.

Her first book accepted for publication was a picture book,Take Me Back, published in 1988. This book took the reader back in time to show how people lived in Australia in the past. For the next few years, Ciddor continued to write and illustrate non-fiction books, concentrating on bringing history to life for children. In 2002 Allen and Unwin published her first historical fantasy, Runestone, book 1 of Viking Magic. This children's novel, and the other Viking Magic books that followed, use historical details and strong storylines.

In 2005 Ciddor was awarded a two-year grant by the Literature Board of the Australia Council.

Ciddor based her fantasy books on global folk, fairy tale, and myth as well as research into historic lifestyle and belief systems. At the Melbourne Writers Festival in 2007 Ciddor appeared on a panel with Sophie Masson and Kate Forsyth discussing the historical truth behind their fantasy novels. In a study of Canadian children's fantasy, author K.V. Johansen included a chapter on Ciddor's Viking Magic books because 'Although not by a Canadian author, the Viking Magic series is noteworthy' and 'does more towards realistic historical fiction than many "time-travel to learn history" novels'.

In 2016 Ciddor changed to historical fiction with the release of The Family with Two Front Doors, published by Allen and Unwin. It won a Notable Book Award from the Children's Book Council of Australia in March 2017. The Family with Two Front Doors is based on interviews with the author's grandmother Nomi Rabinovitch, and tells the story of Nomi's childhood as the daughter of a rabbi in 1920s Lublin, Poland. The writing style is inspired by Little House on the Prairie, presenting vignettes of the everyday life of a family. The book combines historical fact and imagination but no fantasy elements. According to a review by the Victorian Association for the Teaching of English, it is "an informative, gentle read' that "offers insight into how a Jewish household is run". Unlike most books about the Jewish past, this one does not focus on the Holocaust and "there is... no violence and no hatred... but a charming reconstruction of daily routines". Readings Bookstore, winners of the international Bookstore of the Year Award described The Family with Two Front Doors as a modern counterpart to the classic book Little Women. It was published in the US by Kar-Ben, a division of Lerner Books in 2018, and chosen as a Junior Library Guild Selection. In 2019 it was translated into Polish as Dwoje drzwi i dziewięcioro dzieci and published in Poland by Mamania .

Ciddor's book, 52 Mondays, published by Allen and Unwin in 2019, is a fictionalised account of Ciddor's own childhood, filled with memories of Melbourne in the 1960s. It was shortlisted for the 2019 REAL Awards, longlisted for the inaugural Book Links Award for Children's Historical Fiction.

Ciddor's most recent book is The Boy Who Stepped Through Time, published by Allen and Unwin in 2021. The historical details for the novel were provided by Tamara Lewit who is a professional archaeologist and historian specialising in Ancient Rome. According to a Readings Bookstore review "Anna Ciddor has vividly brought the Roman era to life with authentic historical flourishes. The Boy Who Stepped Through Time is a sweet, funny romp perfect for history buffs ages 8+." In 2021 it was long listed for the ARA Historical Novel Prize. In 2022 it was shortlisted for the Aurealis Awards for Best Children's Fiction.

In 2021 Ciddor won the Nance Donkin award for Children's Literature.

Ciddor has written and illustrated over fifty books.

Awards 
 Nance Donkin Award for Children's Literature winner 2021
The Boy Who Stepped Through Time – ARA Historical Novel Prize long list 2021 Aurealis Award for Best Children's Fiction short list
52 Mondays – shortlisted for the 2019 REAL Awards, longlisted for the inaugural Book Links Award for Children's Historical Fiction
The Family with Two Front Doors – Notable Book, Children's Book Council of Australia 2017, shortlisted for the Speech Pathology Australia Book Award 2017, Junior Library Guild selection in America 
 Night of the Fifth Moon – Notable Book, Children's Book Council of Australia 2008
 Two-year New Work Grant from the Literature Board of the Australia Council 2005
 Runestone – Notable Book, Children's Book Council of Australia 2003

Books

Trade market books 
 Have Kids, Will Travel, 1995, Silver Gum Press,   
 Going Places: The Kids’ Own Travel Book, 1995, Silver Gum Press,   
 Unplugged: the bare facts on toilets through the ages, 1997, Allen and Unwin,    
 Runestone the first book in the Viking Magic series, 2002, Allen and Unwin, 
 Wolfspell the second book in the Viking Magic series, 2003, Allen and Unwin,  
 Stormriders the third book in the Viking Magic series, 2004, Allen and Unwin,   
 Prisoner of Quentaris, 2006, Lothian Books an imprint of Hachette,  
 Night of the Fifth Moon, 2007, Allen and Unwin,   
 1000 Great Places to Travel with Kids in Australia, 2011, Explore Australia Publishing, a division of Hardie Grant,  
 The Family with Two Front Doors, 2016, Allen and Unwin, 2018, Kar-Ben , 2019 as Dwoje drzwi i dziewięcioro dzieci, Mamania 
52 Mondays, 2019, Allen and Unwin, 
The Boy Who Stepped Through Time, 2021, Allen and Unwin,

Educational market books (a selection) 

 Christmas in Australia, CIS Publishers, 1993, 
 Through Children's Eyes series, 1995, Macmillan Education Australia,  
 Australia in the Twentieth Century set of 11 volumes, 1998, Macmillan Education Australia,  
 Mountain of Gold, 2001, Barrie Publishing,  
 Federation: Changing Australia, 2001, Macmillan Education Australia,

References

External links 

 

1957 births
Living people
Writers from Melbourne